Tullia is a 1533 Italian play by Lodovico Martelli about the Roman queen Tullia Minor. The play is an example of an extreme imitation of classical Greek theater. The play features a 212-line monologue, (where Lucius Tarquinius Superbus reveals himself to Tullia) making it one of the longest in Renaissance tragedy.

References

Further reading

External links
 Tullia, at Google Books

1533 plays
Plays set in ancient Rome
Plays based on real people
Cultural depictions of Tullia Minor
Cultural depictions of Lucius Tarquinius Superbus
Plays set in the 6th century BC